The 1974 NHL Expansion Draft was held on June 12, 1974.  The draft took place to fill the rosters of the league's two expansion teams for the 1974–75 season, the Kansas City Scouts and the Washington Capitals.

Rules

Draft results

See also
1974 NHL Amateur Draft
1974–75 NHL season

External links
 1974 NHL Expansion Draft player stats at The Internet Hockey Database

Draft
Kansas City Scouts
Washington Capitals
National Hockey League expansion drafts